The Cheat is a 1915 American silent drama film directed by Cecil B. DeMille, starring Fannie Ward, Sessue Hayakawa, and Jack Dean, Ward's real-life husband.

In 1993, the film was selected for preservation in the United States National Film Registry.

Plot

Edith Hardy is a spoiled society woman who continues to buy expensive clothes even when her husband, Richard, tells her all his money is sunk into a stock speculation and he can't pay her bills until the stock goes up. She even delays paying her maid her wages, and the embarrassed Richard must do so. Edith is also the treasurer of the local Red Cross fund drive for Belgian refugees, which holds a gala dance at the home of Hishuru Tori, a rich Japanese ivory merchant (or, in the 1918 re-release, Haka Arakau, a rich Burmese ivory merchant). He is an elegant and dangerously sexy man, to whom Edith seems somewhat drawn; he shows her his roomful of treasures, and stamps one of them with a heated brand to show that it belongs to him.

A society friend of the Hardys tells Edith that Richard's speculation will not be profitable and he knows a better one; he then offers to double her money in one day if she gives it to him to invest in the suggested enterprise. Edith, wanting to live lavishly and unwilling to wait for Richard to realize his speculation, takes the $10,000 the Red Cross has raised from her bedroom safe and gives it to the society friend.

The next day, however, her horrified friend tells her his tip was worthless and her money is completely lost. The Red Cross ladies have scheduled the handover of the money to the refugee fund for the day after that. Edith goes to Tori/Arakau to beg for a loan of the money, and he agrees to write her a check in return for her sexual favours the next day. She reluctantly agrees to this, takes his check and is able to give the money to the Red Cross. Then Richard announces elatedly that his investments have paid off and they are very rich. Edith asks him for $10,000, saying it is for a bridge debt, and he writes her a check for the amount with no reproof.

She takes it to Tori/Arakau, but he says she cannot buy her way out of their bargain. When she struggles against his advances, he takes his heated brand used to mark his possessions and brands her with it on the shoulder. In their struggle after that, she finds a gun on the floor and shoots him. She runs away just as Richard, hearing the struggle, bursts into the house. He finds the check he wrote to his wife there. Tori/Arakau is only wounded in the shoulder, not killed; when his servants call the police, Richard declares that he shot him, and Tori/Arakau does not dispute this.

Edith pleads with Tori/Arakau not to press charges, but he refuses to spare Richard. She visits Richard in his jail cell and confesses everything, and he orders her not to tell anyone else  and let him take the blame. At the crowded trial, both he and Tori/Arakau, his arm in a sling, testify that he was the shooter but will not say why. The jury finds Richard guilty.

This is too much for Edith, and she rushes to the witness stand and shouts that she shot Tori/Arakau "and this is my defense". She bares her shoulder and shows everyone in the courtroom the brand on her shoulder. The male spectators are infuriated and rush to the front, clearly intending to lynch Tori/Arakau. The judge protects him and manages to hold them off. He then sets aside the verdict, and the prosecutor withdraws the charges. Richard lovingly and protectively leads the chastened Edith from the courtroom.

Cast
 Fannie Ward as Edith Hardy
 Sessue Hayakawa as Hishuru Tori (original release) / Haka Arakau (1918 re-release)
Jack Dean as Richard Hardy
 James Neill as Jones
 Yutaka Abe as Tori's Valet
 Dana Ong as District Attorney
 Hazel Childers as Mrs. Reynolds
 Arthur H. Williams as Courtroom Judge (as Judge Arthur H. Williams)
 Raymond Hatton as Courtroom Spectator (uncredited)
 Dick La Reno as Courtroom Spectator (uncredited)
 Lucien Littlefield as Hardy's Secretary (uncredited)

Production and release
Upon its release, The Cheat was both a critical and commercial success. The film's budget was $17,311. It grossed $96,389 domestically and $40,975 in the overseas market. According to Scott Eyman's Empire of Dreams: The Epic Life of Cecil B. DeMille, the film cost $16,540 to make, and grossed $137,364.

Upon its release, the character of Hishuru Tori was described as a Japanese ivory merchant. Japanese Americans protested against the film for portraying a Japanese person as sinister. In particular, a Japanese newspaper in Los Angeles, Rafu Shimpo, waged a campaign against the film and heavily criticized Hayakawa's appearance. When the film was re-released in 1918, the character of Hishuru was renamed "Haka Arakau" and described in the title cards as a "Burmese ivory king". The change of the character's name and nationality were done because Japan was an American ally at the time. Robert Birchard, author of the book Cecil B. DeMille's Hollywood, surmised that the character's nationality was changed to Burmese because there were "not enough Burmese in the country to raise a credible protest." Despite the changes, the film was banned in the United Kingdom and was never released in Japan.

The film inspired French film critics to coin the term photogenie to specify cinema's medium-specific qualities and was filmed with innovative usage of lighting that helped raise awareness of film as a serious art form.

Accolades
The film was nominated for the American Film Institute's 2001 list AFI's 100 Years...100 Thrills. It was also nominated in the 2007 AFI's 100 Years...100 Movies (10th Anniversary Edition) list.

Remakes and adaptations
The film was remade in 1923, with George Fitzmaurice as director and Pola Negri and Jack Holt starring. In 1931, Paramount again remade The Cheat, with Broadway mogul George Abbott as director and starring Tallulah Bankhead.

The Cheat was also remade in France as Forfaiture (1937) directed by Marcel L'Herbier. This version, however, makes significant changes to the original story, even though Hayakawa was cast once again as the sexually predatory Asian man.

An operatic adaptation of the story, La Forfaiture, with music by Camille Erlanger and a libretto by André de Lorde and Paul Milliet, premiered at the Opéra-Comique in 1921. The first opera to be based on a film scenario, it was not a success, playing only three times.

Availability
A copy of The Cheat is preserved at the George Eastman House. This surviving version is the 1918 re-release footage which includes changes to the Hishuru Tori character.

The Cheat, which is now in public domain, was released on DVD in 2002 with another DeMille film Manslaughter (1922) by Kino International.

References

External links 
 
 
 
 

1915 films
1915 drama films
American silent feature films
Asian-American drama films
American black-and-white films
Films directed by Cecil B. DeMille
Films shot in California
Paramount Pictures films
United States National Film Registry films
Articles containing video clips
Surviving American silent films
Japan in non-Japanese culture
Films adapted into operas
1910s American films
Silent American drama films
1910s English-language films